The Estadio Olímpico de Villahermosa is a multi-use stadium located in Villahermosa, Tabasco, Mexico.  It is currently used mostly for football matches and is the home stadium for Pumas Tabasco.  The stadium has a capacity of 12,000 people.

References

External links

1992 Copa Interamericana match in the stadium highlights
Mexico vs. Peñarol friendly match in Villahermosa

Sports venues in Tabasco
Olímpico de Villahermosa
Athletics (track and field) venues in Mexico